= Café Coco =

Restaurant in Nashville, Tennessee, US

Coordinates: 36°09′08″N 86°48′19″W

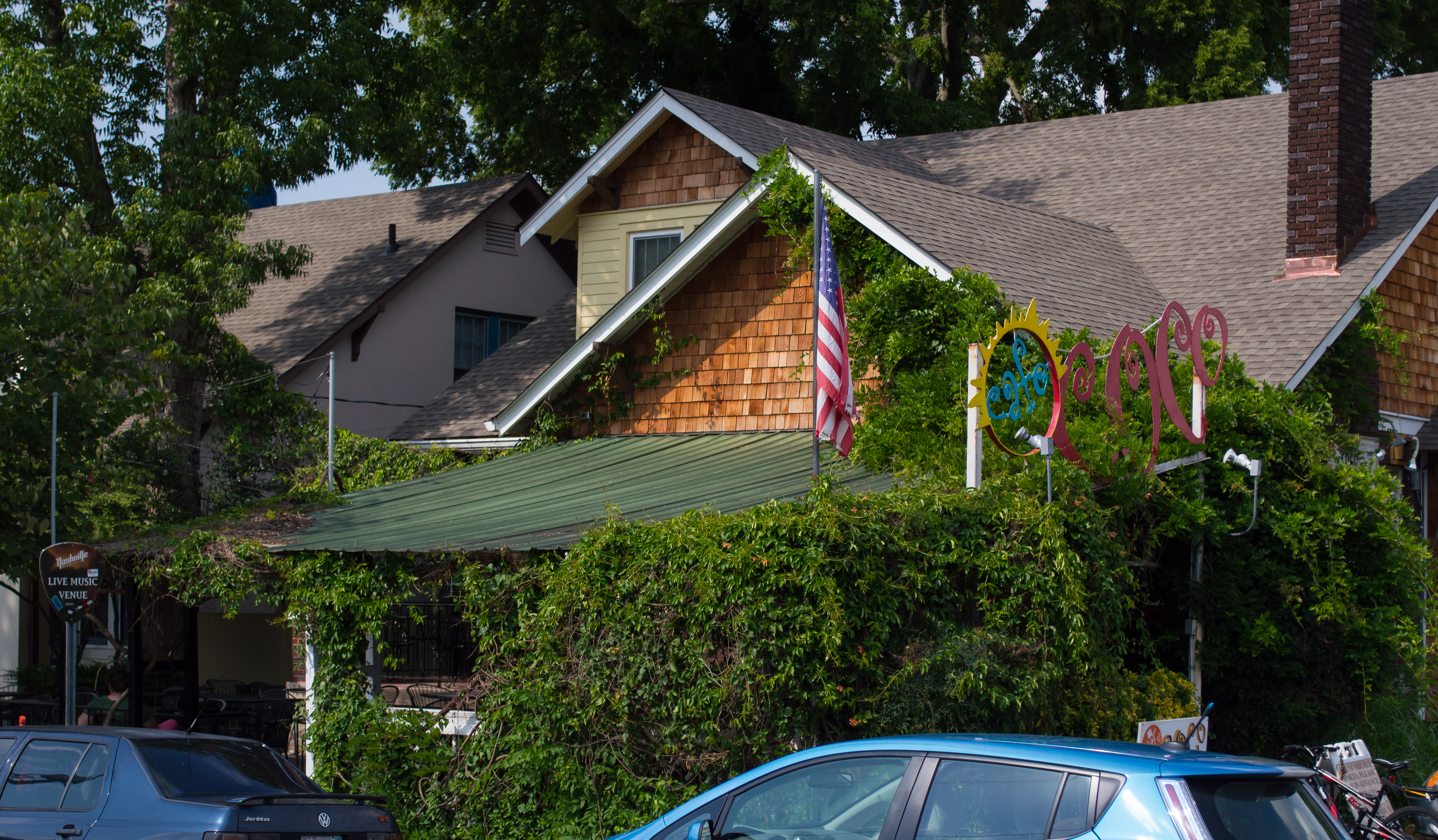
- Interactive map of Café Coco

Restaurant information
- Established: 1995
- Owners: Coco Vallis and Chuck Cinelli
- Location: 210 Louise Avenue, Nashville, Tennessee, 37203, USA
- Website: www.cafecoco.com

Café Coco was a 24-hour cafe located at 210 Louise Avenue near Elliston Place in Nashville, Tennessee. During the day it is primarily a coffee shop, and at night it has live music, poetry, and comedy. It is one of Nashville's few non-chain 24-hour food establishments.

The menu includes sandwiches, pasta, burgers, salad, pizza, cake, beer, coffee, and drinks. Wi-fi is available for free. College students and rappers frequent the cafe, and the cafe patio is often used by smoking patrons.

Café Coco briefly announced that it was going to acquire an Italian theme, but these plans were later cancelled.

The cafe was founded in 1995 by and was co-owned by Coco Vallis and still is owned by former New Yorker Chuck Cinelli (a third generation restaurateur), who are husband and wife.

As of November 22, 2023 the restaurant closed permanently and in August 2024 it was announced that the space was to be repurposed into two new concepts.
